Cesare Cardini (also known as Caesar Cardini, February 24, 1896 – November 3, 1956) was an Italian restaurateur, chef, and hotel owner who, along with his brother Alex Cardini (November 23, 1899 – December 22, 1974), is credited with creating Caesar salad at his Tijuana restaurant, Caesar's.

Biography
Caesar Cardini was born as Cesare Cardini in Baveno, a comune on the shore of Lago Maggiore, and had seven siblings: Bonifacio, Annibale, Nereo, Alessandro, Carlotta, Gaudenzio and Maria. While the sisters, Bonifacio, and Annibale stayed in Italy, the other three brothers emigrated to America; Nereo opened a small hotel near the casino in Santa Cruz, California; Alessandro and Gaudenzio eventually were in the restaurant business in Mexico City. Alessandro, called Alex in the US, is reported to have been Caesar's partner in Tijuana, Mexico. Cesare sailed as a steerage passenger on board the RMS Olympic which arrived at the Port of New York on May 1, 1913. After inspection at Ellis Island, he boarded a train bound for Montreal.

Cesare eventually returned to Italy but returned to the United States in 1919. With his partner William Brown, he ran Brown's Restaurant in Sacramento, then moved to San Diego. At that time, he established the first of several restaurants in Tijuana, where he could avoid the restrictions of Prohibition. He married the musician Camille D. Stump on August 27, 1924 in Santa Ana, California. The couple had one daughter, Rosa Maria Cardini (1928–2003).

Cardini is credited with creating Caesar salad in 1924; it soon became fashionable among Hollywood and other celebrities, especially after he had moved his restaurant a few blocks to the hotel, which was built around 1929 (nowadays called Hotel Caesar's).

After the repeal of the Volstead Act and the Mexican government's enactment of a ban on gambling, business from tourism to Tijuana drastically fell off. Cardini quit his Mexican businesses in 1936 and moved back to San Diego to establish the Caesar Cardini Cafe.  For several years, he operated Tavern Hacienda in San Diego, the Beacon Inn in Cardiff-by-the-Sea and his own Caesar Cardini Villa in  Chula Vista.

The family moved to Los Angeles about 1938 and Cardini focused on the production and marketing of his salad dressing which he trademarked in 1948. He died in Good Samaritan Hospital on November 3, 1956, in Los Angeles following a stroke at his home at 8738 Bonner Drive and was buried in Inglewood Park Cemetery. His daughter took control of Caesar Cardini Foods Inc. Later, the Cardini's brand was sold, and is now owned by the T. Marzetti specialty salad dressing company. It is still popular and offers more than a dozen varieties of the original recipe.

Legacy

In Tijuana, Caesar's Restaurant and Bar on Avenida Revolución, now under Baja Med celebrity chef Javier Plascencia, serves the "original Caesar's salad".

See also
Carmen Ramírez Degollado
Zarela Martinez

References

1896 births
1956 deaths
Mexican people of Italian descent
Italian chefs
Mexican chefs
People from Tijuana
Burials at Inglewood Park Cemetery
Mexican restaurateurs
Italian emigrants to the United States
20th-century Mexican businesspeople
Caesar salad